Radek Novotný (born 20 October 1974, Hradec Králové) is a Czech orienteering competitor. He received a bronze medal in the relay at the 2001 World Orienteering Championships with the Czech team.

See also
 Czech orienteers
 List of orienteers
 List of orienteering events

References

1974 births
Living people
Sportspeople from Hradec Králové
Czech orienteers
Male orienteers
Foot orienteers
World Orienteering Championships medalists